Double Rainbow may refer to:

 Double rainbow, a variation of the meteorological phenomenon
 Double Rainbow (ice cream), a brand of premium ice cream, sorbets, and frozen desserts

Media
 Double Rainbow (album), Aya Matsuura's sixth album
 Double Rainbow (viral video), a viral video filmed by Paul "Bear" Vasquez
 Double Rainbow: The Music of Antonio Carlos Jobim, a 1995 album by jazz saxophonist Joe Henderson
 "Double Rainbow", a song from the 1979 Sarah Vaughan album Copacabana
 "Double Rainbow", a song from the 2013 Katy Perry album Prism